Khaled Al-Hamdhi (born 17 August 1991) is a Saudi professional footballer who plays as a midfielder for Al-Adalah.

References

External links 
 

1991 births
Living people
Saudi Arabian footballers
Ras Tanura SC players
Ettifaq FC players
Al-Orobah FC players
Khaleej FC players
Al-Adalah FC players
Saudi First Division League players
Saudi Professional League players
Association football midfielders